Bittacy Hill Park is a small public park in Mill Hill in the London Borough of Barnet.

It is a hilly grassed area with mature trees, a children's playground and two free tennis courts.

There is access from Bittacy Hill and Brownsea Walk, and by a footpath from between 27 and 29 Bittacy Rise.

See also
 Barnet parks and open spaces

External links
 Kids Fun London, Bittacy Hill Park

References

Parks and open spaces in the London Borough of Barnet